Senegalia catechu is a deciduous, thorny tree which grows up to  in height. The plant is called khair  in Hindi, and kachu in Malay, hence the name was Latinized to "catechu" in Linnaean taxonomy, as the type-species from which the extracts cutch and catechu are derived. Common names for it include kher, catechu, cachou, cutchtree, black cutch, and black catechu.

Senegalia catechu is native to South Asia and Southeast Asia, including the Indian subcontinent, Myanmar, Thailand and China (Yunnan).

Through derivatives of the flavanols in its extracts, the species has lent its name to the important catechins, catechols and catecholamines of chemistry and biology.

Uses

Food

The tree's seeds are a good source of protein. Kattha (catechu), an extract of its heartwood, is used as an ingredient to give red color and typical flavor to paan. Paan is an Indian and Southeast Asian tradition of chewing betel leaf (Piper betle) with areca nut and slaked lime paste.

Fodder
Branches of the tree are quite often cut for goat fodder and are sometimes fed to cattle.

Folk medicine 
The heartwood, bark, and wood extract (called catechu) are used in traditional medicine. The concentrated aqueous extract, known as khayer gum or cutch, is astringent.

Wood

The tree is often planted for use as firewood and charcoal and its wood is highly valued for furniture and tools.  The wood has a density of about 0.88 g/cm3.

Other uses
Its heartwood extract is used in dyeing and leather tanning, as a preservative for fishing nets, and as a viscosity regulator for oil drilling. Its flowers are a good source of nectar and pollen for bees.

Cultivation

The tree can be propagated by planting its seeds, which are soaked in hot water first. After about six months in a nursery, the seedlings can be planted in the field.

See also
 Arid Forest Research Institute
 Catechu
 Catechin
 Pyrocatechol

References

External links

catechu
Flora of the Indian subcontinent
Flora of Myanmar
Flora of Thailand
Flora of Yunnan
Plants used in Ayurveda
Plant dyes